Hypohippus (Greek: "under" (hypos), "horse" (hippos)) is an extinct genus of three-toed horse, which lived 17–11 million years ago. It was a long-necked, high-shouldered browser with sub-hypsodont, lophodont (rhino-like) dentition, that fed on the tough vegetation of forest understory and shrubs. Its deep preorbital fossae and retraction of the nasal notch hint at the presence of a long, muscular and prehensile upper lip that would aid during selective browsing. Overall its ecology would have been more comparable to modern okapi than to grazing horses.
Fossils of it have been found in Nebraska, Colorado, and Montana.

References 

Miocene horses
Miocene odd-toed ungulates
Prehistoric placental genera
Miocene mammals of North America
Barstovian
Clarendonian
Fossil taxa described in 1858
Taxa named by Joseph Leidy